The 2017 Liga 3 West Java is the third edition of Liga 3 West Java as a qualifying round for the national round of 2017 Liga 3. 

The competition scheduled starts on August 9, 2017.

Round and draw dates
The schedule will be follows.

Teams
There are 46 clubs which will participate the league in this season.

References

Link 
Facebook page

2017 in Indonesian football
Sport in West Java